PSR B0943+10 is a pulsar 2,000 light years from Earth in the direction of the constellation of Leo. It was discovered at Pushchino in December 1968, original designation of this pulsar was PP 0943, it became the first pulsar discovered by Soviet astronomers.

Characteristics
The pulsar is estimated to be 5 million years old, which is relatively old for a pulsar. It has a rotational period of 1.1 seconds and emits both radio waves and X-rays. 
Ongoing research at the University of Vermont discovered that the pulsar was found to flip roughly every few hours between a radio bright mode with highly organized pulsations and a quieter mode with rather chaotic temporal structure.

Moreover, the observations of the pulsar performed simultaneously with the European Space Agency's XMM-Newton X-ray observatory and ground-based radio telescopes revealed that it exhibits variations in its X-ray emission that mimic in reverse the changes seen in radio waves – the pulsar has a weaker non-pulsing X-ray luminosity during the radio bright mode and is actually brighter during the radio quiet mode emitting distinct X-ray pulses. Such changes can only be explained if the pulsar's magnetosphere (which may extend up to 52,000 km from the surface) quickly switches between two extreme states. The change happens on a few seconds timescale, far faster than most pulsars. Despite being one of the first pulsars discovered the mechanism for its unusual behavior is unknown.

A research group from Peking University published a paper suggesting that the pulsar may actually be a low-mass quark star.

Planetary system

In May 2014, two gas giants were found orbiting PSR B0943+10.

Notes

References

Leo (constellation)
Pulsars
Stellar phenomena
Planetary systems with two confirmed planets